Bada Gaon is a village near Khekra, a town in the district of Bagpat, Uttar Pradesh. It is famous for Shri Parshwanath Atishaya Kshetra Prachin Digambar Jain Mandir that houses an idol of Lord Parshvanath, the 23rd Tirthankara of Jainism and the Trilok Teerth Dham Mandir.

Its proximity to Delhi, has made it a prominent religious site.  It is roughly about 29 km from Dilshad Garden (East Delhi) and one can go from either State Highway 57 or Loni-Bhopura Road.

Jain Temple

Shri Parshwanath Atishaya Kshetra Prachin Digambar Jain Mandir

This centuries old temple is dedicated to Parshvanatha, the 23rd tirthankar.
Moolnayak of this temple is a white marble idol of Parshvanatha which was recovered from a well inside the temple. The idol is considered miraculous as well as water of the well is believed to have curative powers. Apart from the main idol, several other idols were also discovered during excavation which have also been installed in separate altars.

Trilok Teerth Dham

Trilok Teerth Dham is built in shape of Jain Emblem. This temple is 317 feet in height out of which 100 feet is below the ground and 217 feet above the ground. On top of the temple there is a 31 feet tall statue of Rishabhdev made up of Ashtadhatu (8 metals) in padmasan posture. This temple is dedicated to Parshvantha. This temple also has a 108 feet Manasthamb (tower of pride). The main idol was found in 1922 when Jain saint anant kirti maharaj predicted that the idol was in the hill. As the name is pronounced trilok teerth will have full depiction of three lokas i.e. Adharvlok Madhyalok & Urdhavlok. This temple includes a meditation center, Samavasarana, Nandishwar Dweep, Trikaal Chaubisi, Meru Temple, Lotus Temple, Parshvanath temple, Jambudweep. Temple also has a dharamshala equipped with all modern facilities.

References

Bada Gaon is a village near Khekra, a town in the district of Bagpat, Uttar Pradesh. It is famous for maa mansha devi mandir. famous for a temple that it is related to Ravan

Villages in Bagpat district